Eltun Yagublu (born 19 August 1991) is an Azerbaijani footballer who last played as a defender for Sabail in the Azerbaijan Premier League.

Club career
On 20 February 2012, Yagublu made his debut in the Azerbaijan Premier League for Qarabağ match against Kapaz.

Honours
Qarabağ
 Azerbaijan Premier League (2): 2013–14, 2015–16

 Azerbaijan Cup (1): 2015–16

References

External links
 

1991 births
Living people
Association football defenders
Azerbaijani footballers
Azerbaijan Premier League players
Neftçi PFK players
Qarabağ FK players
Sabail FK players
Footballers from Baku